Katerynivka is an urban-type settlement in the Luhansk Raion of the Luhansk Oblast of Ukraine. Population: 

The city was formerly named Yuvileine, as part of the Soviet Union, and during its early years following Ukrainian independence. On 12 May 2016 it was renamed  Katerynivka by the Ukrainian government in a systematic renaming of small cities as part of decommunization.

, the city is under the control of the Russian military as a part of the invasion of Ukraine and occupation, but that annexation by Russia is not been accepted by the international community. The city was previously controlled by the self-declared Luhansk People's Republic.

References

Urban-type settlements in Luhansk Raion